Royalty may refer to:

 Any individual monarch, such as a king, queen, emperor, empress, princess, etc.
 Royal family, the immediate family of a king or queen regnant, and sometimes his or her extended family
 Royalty payment for use of such things as intellectual property, music, or natural resources

Music
 The Royalty (band), a 2005–2013 American rock band
 Royalty Records, a Canadian record label

Albums
 Royalty (Chris Brown album), 2015
 Royalty (EP), by EarthGang, 2018
 Royalty (mixtape), by Childish Gambino (Donald Glover), 2012
 The Royalty (album), by the Royal Royal, 2012
 The Royalty: La Realeza, by R.K.M & Ken-Y, 2008

Songs
 "Royalty" (Down with Webster song), 2012
 "Royalty" (XXXTentacion song), 2019
 "Royalty", by Conor Maynard, 2015
 "Royalty", by Nas from The Lost Tapes 2, 2019

Theatres
 Royalty Theatre, a demolished theatre in Soho, London, England
 Royalty Theatre, Glasgow, a demolished theatre in Scotland
 Peacock Theatre, previously the Royalty Theatre, a West End theatre in London

Other uses
 Royalty (grape), a variety of grape
 Royalty, Texas, US
 Royalty Magazine, a British monthly
 The Royalty (TV series), a 1957 British series

See also
Royal (disambiguation)
Royals (disambiguation)
Monarchy (disambiguation)